Kiyonori (written: 清訓 or 清憲) is a masculine Japanese given name. Notable people with the name include:

 (1928–2011), Japanese architect
Kiyonori Saito (born 1947), Japanese television actor known under his stage name Daisuke Ban

See also
Kiyonari, a similar Japanese masculine given name

Japanese masculine given names